This is a listing of the horses that finished in either first, second, or third place and the number of starters in the Illinois Derby, an American Grade 2 race for three-year-olds at 1-1/8 miles on dirt held at Hawthorne Race Course in Cicero, Illinois.  (List 1970-present)

References 

Lists of horse racing results
Hawthorne Race Course